Hirschau is a village in Tübingen district in Baden-Württemberg, Germany. Since 1971, it is an outer district of the city of Tübingen.

Hirschau has a population of 3297 (2020) on an area of 6.17 km2. It is the westernmost district of Tübingen. Hirschau lies to the north of the Neckar river, about 3 km to the east of Wurmlingen, which is a part of Rottenburg am Neckar, and about 6 km to the east of the town centre of Rottenburg am Neckar as well as to the west of the city centre of Tübingen.

The highest point is the Spitzberg at 475 m above mean sea level.

Unlike most of Tübingen, Hirschau is, like neighbouring Rottenburg, mostly Roman Catholic.

References

Villages in Baden-Württemberg
Boroughs of Tübingen